Fabio Grossi may refer to:

* Fabio Grossi (dancer) (born 1977), Italian dancer and ballet teacher
 Fabio Grossi (athlete) (born 1967), retired Italian sprinter who specialized in the 400 metres